Arthur Lampkin (born circa 1938) is an English former professional motorcycle racer. The oldest son in a Yorkshire motorcycling dynasty, he competed in a variety of off-road motorcycle events such as observed trials, motocross and enduros.

Motorcycling career
Born in Kent, England, Lampkin's father moved the family to Silsden, West Yorkshire in 1941. He began riding his father's BSA motorcycle even before he was old enough to have a licence. Lampkin purchased his first motorcycle from money he had earned from his paper route, and by the age of 18 he had won the British trials national championship.

In the 1960s, he became a member of the BSA factory racing team along with his brother Alan. Lampkin, along with Dave Bickers and Jeff Smith, were part of a group British motorcyclists that dominated the sport of motocross in the early 1960s. In the 1961 European motocross championships, he finished the season in second place behind Bickers. The following year, the championship was upgraded to world championship status and Lampkin finished the year in third place behind Torsten Hallman and Jeff Smith. He was also a member of British motocross teams that won the 250cc Trophée des Nations events in 1961 and 1962, as well as the 1965 500cc Motocross des Nations event.

Lampkin continued to compete in other off-road motorcycle competitions, winning prestigious events such as the 1963 Scottish Six Days Trial, and the Scott Trial in 1960, 1961 and 1965. He also competed internationally in enduro events, representing Great Britain and earning a gold medal in the 1966 International Six Days Trial held in Sweden. Lampkin's younger brothers, Alan and Martin Lampkin also experienced success in motorcycle competitions. Alan won the British trials championship while Martin became a British trials champion as well as winning the 1975 FIM Trial World Championship.

Later life
After retiring from competition, Lampkin took over his father's engineering business. Lampkin's nephew, the son of Martin Lampkin, is twelve-time trials world champion, Dougie Lampkin.

References

External links
 Article on Lampkin Engineering

Living people
1938 births
People from Silsden
People from Kent
British motocross riders
Enduro riders
Motorcycle trials riders
Sportspeople from Yorkshire